Lily Williams (born June 24, 1994) is an American professional racing cyclist, who currently rides for UCI Women's Continental Team . In June 2021, she qualified  to represent the United States at the 2020 Summer Olympics.

References

External links
 

1994 births
Living people
American female cyclists
American track cyclists
Sportspeople from Tallahassee, Florida
UCI Track Cycling World Champions (women)
Cyclists at the 2019 Pan American Games
Pan American Games medalists in cycling
Pan American Games gold medalists for the United States
Medalists at the 2019 Pan American Games
Olympic cyclists of the United States
Cyclists at the 2020 Summer Olympics
Olympic bronze medalists for the United States in cycling
Medalists at the 2020 Summer Olympics
21st-century American women
Cyclists from Florida